Joseph Brooks (born 1960) is the deputy director of Electronics, Optics, and Systems at Georgia Tech Research Institute. He is the former director of the GTRI Electronic Systems Laboratory (ELSYS).

Early life, education and adulthood
Joseph (Joe) Larry Brooks is the third of three children born of Charles William (C.W.) Brooks and Grace Mitchell Brooks of Hiram, Georgia in March 1960. Brooks attended the University of Georgia from 1978 to 1980 before transferring to the Georgia Institute of Technology, where he would earn a Bachelor of Science in electrical engineering in 1982 and Master of Science in Electrical Engineering in 1986.

Brooks married his high school sweetheart, Kellie Williams Brooks, in February 1984. They later had two children, a daughter, Kaylee Rachel Brooks (now Wade) in May 1986 and a son, William Landon Brooks, in September 1989.

Career
Brooks worked as a student assistant at the Georgia Tech Research Institute while earning his bachelor's degree, and was hired as research engineer I in 1982 once he received his bachelor's degree. He worked at GTRI full-time while earning his master's degree, in what was then known as the Systems Engineering Lab (now the Electronic Systems Laboratory).

In November 2010, the previous director of the Electronic Systems Laboratory retired, and Brooks was named interim lab director. In January 2011, he was named the director of the lab. He held this position until 2014, when he was named deputy director of the newly created Electronics, Optics, and Systems Directorate, which oversees ELSYS as well as the Electro-Optical Systems Laboratory and the Applied Systems Laboratory.

References

External links
 Joe Brooks at LinkedIn

Living people
1960 births
Georgia Tech Research Institute people
Place of birth missing (living people)
Georgia Tech alumni